This page lists student organizations of Johns Hopkins University.

Registered Student Organizations

Johns Hopkins has over 500 student-run organizations, each one providing a unique laboratory for learning for those involved. Student organizations provide opportunities for leadership development, building lifelong friendships, sharpening interpersonal skills, and improving organization. The University Office of Leadership Engagement & Experiential Development (LEED) is the hub for all undergraduate and graduate student organizations on the Homewood Campus at JHU. A comprehensive list of all student organizations, inclusive of all nine schools at JHU can be found on Hopkins Groups.

Fraternity and Sorority Life 
The University recognizes ten fraternities, fourteen sororities, and 2 co-educational professional fraternities which include approximately 25% of the student body. Fraternities and sororities has been a part of the university culture since 1877, when Beta Theta Pi fraternity became the first to form a chapter on campus. Sororities arrived at Hopkins in 1976. As with all Hopkins programs, discrimination on the basis of "marital status, pregnancy, race, color, ethnicity, national origin, age, disability, religion, sexual orientation, veteran status" is prohibited. JHU also has an anti–hazing policy and prohibits alcohol at recruitment activities. Hopkins does not permit "city–wide" chapters, and requires all members of a JHU recognized fraternity or sorority to be a JHU student.

As of spring 2021, 1,208 students were members of one of Hopkins' fraternities or sororities. The All–FSL Average GPA was 3.84, above the undergraduate average GPA. In spring 2010 the university was considering construction of a "fraternity row" of houses to consolidate the groups on campus.

All Johns Hopkins fraternities and sororities belong to one of three Councils: the Inter–Fraternity Council, the National Panhellenic Conference, and the Intercultural Greek Council which is a combination of the National Pan-Hellenic Council and the Multicultural Council. Additionally, four independent chapters report directly to Fraternity and Sorority Life a unit within Leadership Engagement & Experiential Development.

The Inter–Fraternity Council includes seven fraternities:
 ΑΕΠ – Alpha Epsilon Pi fraternity, Psi chapter founded 1936. Jewish interest.
 ΒΘΠ – Beta Theta Pi fraternity, Alpha Chi chapter founded 1877.
 ΦΔΘ – Phi Delta Theta fraternity, Maryland Delta chapter founded 2009.
 ΦΓΔ – Phi Gamma Delta fraternity, Beta Mu chapter founded 1891.
 ΦΚΨ – Phi Kappa Psi fraternity, Maryland Alpha chapter founded 1879.
 ΣΧ – Sigma Chi fraternity, Kappa Upsilon chapter founded 2004.
 ΣΦΕ – Sigma Phi Epsilon fraternity, Maryland Alpha chapter founded 1929.
The National Panhellenic Conference includes five sororities:
 ΑΦ – Alpha Phi sorority, Zeta Omicron chapter founded 1982.
 ΚΚΓ – Kappa Kappa Gamma sorority, Eta Epsilon chapter founded 1999.
 ΦΜ – Phi Mu sorority, Gamma Tau chapter founded 1982.
 ΠΒΦ – Pi Beta Phi sorority, Maryland Gamma chartered November 20, 2010.
 ΚΑΘ – Kappa Alpha Theta sorority, Zeta Chi chapter founded April 20, 1997, disbanded April 14, 2009, reorganized March 1, 2014.

The Intercultural Greek Council includes the following 10 organizations represented by the NPHC and the MGC.

The National Pan–Hellenic Council includes five historically African–American groups:
 ΔΣΘ – Delta Sigma Theta sorority, Mu Psi chapter chartered 1976.
 ΑΚΑ – Alpha Kappa Alpha sorority, Xi Tau chapter chartered 1976
 ΑΦΑ – Alpha Phi Alpha fraternity, Sigma Sigma chapter founded 1991.
 ΣΓΡ – Sigma Gamma Rho sorority, Rho Omega chapter founded 2009.
 ΚΑΨ – Kappa Alpha Psi fraternity, Rho Upsilon Chapter chartered 2019

The Multicultural Council includes five groups:

 αΚΔΦ – alpha Kappa Delta Phi sorority, associate chapter founded 1997. Asian–American interest.
 ΔΞΦ – Delta Xi Phi sorority, Lambda chapter founded 2003. Multicultural interest.
 ΛΠΧ – Latinas Promoviendo Comunidad Lambda Pi Chi sorority, Sigma chapter charted 2004
 ΛΥΛ – Lambda Upsilon Lambda fraternity, Phi chapter charted in 1995
 ΣΙΑ – Hermandad de Sigma Iota Alpha Incorporada, Beta Zeta chapter chartered 2017
 ΣΟΠ – Sigma Omicron Pi sorority, Lambda chapter founded 2002. Asian–American interest.

These four independent organization are recognized at the University under the Fraternity and Sorority Life a unit within Leadership Engagement & Experiential Development.

 IX Society, Johns Hopkins Chapter founded in 2009 primarily for women.  
 ΔΦ – Delta Phi Fraternity (also known as St. Elmo's), Xi chapter founded in 1885
 ΑΚΨ – Alpha Kappa Psi business fraternity, Rho Psi chapter founded 2001.
 ΘΤ – Theta Tau engineering fraternity.

Kappa Alpha Theta, a National Panhellenic Conference (NPC) sorority, was disbanded by its national headquarters on April 14, 2009 after twelve years on campus. The removal was due to repeated risk management violations.  Theta was reorganized on March 1, 2014.

In March 2010, Johns Hopkins University officially opened for NPC extension. In May 2010, the University Panhellenic Council selected Pi Beta Phi, which opened in the fall of 2010.

Recruitment for Inter–Fraternity Council and Panhellenic Conference fraternities and sororities takes place during the spring semester for freshmen, though some groups recruit upperclassmen during the fall semester. All participants must have completed one semester and must be in good academic standing.

Many of the fraternities maintain houses off campus, but no sororities do. Baltimore City allows housing to be zoned specifically for use as a fraternity or sorority house, but in practice this zoning code has not been awarded for at least 50 years. Only Sigma Phi Epsilon's building has this zoning code due to its consistent ownership since the 1920s.

Honor and Professional Societies 
The university is home to a number of professional fraternities, societies, and honor organizations.
 ΑΕΔ – Alpha Epsilon Delta pre-med honor society.
 ΑΚΨ – Alpha Kappa Psi business fraternity, Rho Psi chapter founded 2001.
 ΑΦΩ - Alpha Phi Omega National Service Fraternity, Kappa Mu chapter founded 1952
 ΒΒΒ – Beta Beta Beta biology honor society, Rho Phi chapter.
 ΛΕΜ – Lambda Epsilon Mu Latino pre-med honor society.
 ΝΡΨ – Nu Rho Psi neuroscience honor society.
 ΣΙΡ – Sigma Iota Rho international studies honor society.
 SHPE – Society of Hispanic Professional Engineers.
 ΤΒΠ - Tau Beta Pi The Engineering Honor Society.
 ΘΤ – Theta Tau engineering fraternity.

Student publications

Hopkins has many student publications.
 The Johns Hopkins News-Letter, founded in 1896, is one of the oldest continuously published weekly college newspapers in the nation with a press run of 5,200. The News-Letter won an Associated Collegiate Press Newspaper Pacemaker award for four–year, non–daily college newspapers in 2007.
 JHU Politik, founded in 2008 as the University's only bi-partisan political publication, produces a weekly magazine, The Politik Press.  The Politik Press contains student written op-eds and interviews with professors, professionals and experts in various political fields.  Every semester JHU Politik publishes a special issue to highlight diverse perspectives on singular topics. JHU Politik is also responsible for numerous speakers events on campus as well as more informal discussions and conversations that take place throughout the academic year.
 Epidemic Proportions is the university's public health research journal, designed to highlight JHU research and field work in public health. Combining research and scholarship, the journal seeks to capture the breadth and depth of the JHU undergraduate public health experience.
 Thoroughfare, Zeniada and j.mag are literary magazines. Prometheus is the undergraduate philosophy journal.
 Frame of Reference is an annual magazine that focuses on film and film culture.
 The New Diplomat is the multi–disciplinary international relations journal. Foundations is the undergraduate history journal.
 Américas is the Latin American Studies journal.
 Argot is the undergraduate anthropology journal.
 The Triple Helix is the university's journal to address issues concerning science, law and society.
 Perspectives is the official newsletter of the Black Student Union.
 The Black & Blue Jay is among the nation's oldest campus humor magazines. It was founded in 1920. According to The Johns Hopkins News–Letter, the magazine's name led the News–Letter to first use the moniker Blue Jays to refer to a Hopkins athletic team in 1923. While the magazine enjoyed popularity among students, it received repeated opposition from the university administration, reportedly for its vulgar humor. In October 1934, Dean Edward R. Berry removed financial support for the magazine; without funding, the magazine continued under the name The Blue Jay until Berry threatened to expel the editors in 1939. The magazine had a revival in 1984, and has appeared intermittently since then.
 The Hopkins Donkey was a political newspaper with a Democratic perspective on international, national and statewide political topics. It is now defunct.
 The Carrollton Record was a political newspaper with an American conservative perspective on campus and citywide politics.  Like the Hopkins Donkey, it is now defunct.

Student–Run businesses

Hopkins Student Enterprises (HSE) is a venture capital fund and umbrella organization with the goal of fostering innovation and facilitating resources and mentorship to student entrepreneurs. Current businesses that are in operation are as follows:
 Hopkins Consulting Agency (HCA)—Business and technology consulting company that prepares technology commercialization reports and business plans.
 Hopkins Student Movers (HSM)—Moving and storage company that serves JHU faculty, staff, and students and the broader Baltimore community.
 Hopkins Creative Design (HCD)—Full service graphic design company.
 The Blue Jay Cleaners - Student janitorial service for all on-campus and select off campus residence halls.
 The Complete Dorm Room - Dorm essential delivery service with over 130 items to choose from including everything from linens to printers.
 Hop and Shake - Health food kiosk located in the Ralph S. O' Connor Recreation center
 Hopkins: Printer ink delivery service for Homewood and surrounding Charles Village.
 Blue Jay Bay: Service for all Hopkins students to buy and sell gently used furniture.
 Blue Jay Boxes - Care package and cake delivery business for Charles Village and the surrounding neighborhoods.

Programming Boards 
In addition to the many clubs that exist on campus, there are a set of groups that directly advised by the LEED office to run major activities and events on campus including:
 The HOP - The Hopkins Organization for Programming  is a group responsible for a continuous stream of on campus events. They also are known to co-sponsor other groups events to help bring other groups visions to life when as the HOP has more resources at their disposal then most groups.

Symposiums
Established in 1967, the Milton S. Eisenhower Symposium is a student-run lecture series at the Johns Hopkins University.

Established in 1998, the Foreign Affairs Symposium has hosted a speaker series for the student body, with past speakers including Edward Snowden, Gloria Steinem and Dr. Cornel West.

Established in 2018, the Osler Medical Symposium is a student-run speaker series that hopes to bridge the divide between those making decisions in medicine and those affected by these decisions. Notable past symposia include Dr. Leana Wen, former Baltimore City Commissioner of Health and current President of Planned Parenthood; Dr. Paul B. Rothman, Dean/CEO of Johns Hopkins Medicine; Dr. Joshua Sharfstein, former Principal Deputy Commissioner of the Food and Drug Administration and former Baltimore Commissioner of Health; Dr. Peter Beilenson, former Baltimore City Commissioner of Health and current Sacramento County Commissioner of Health; and Dr. Peter Agre, Nobel Prize Winner in Chemistry.

Additional student organizations
Since 1918, the Johns Hopkins University Barnstormers (originally known as the dramatics club) has been performing various works on campus. In their current set-up they put on five shows a year. Two MainStage productions (a fall play and a spring musical) as well as a spring cabaret, an intersession show and series of one-acts done performed by freshmen. They will be celebrating their 100th anniversary in the 2018-2019 school year.

Since 1972, the Johns Hopkins Outdoors Club, or JHOC, has organized weekend trips for students looking to experience the outdoors. Along with Outdoor Pursuits, an arm of the University's Rec Center, JHOC offers students the opportunity to participate in activities such as canoeing, kayaking, caving, and mountain biking.

The Johns Hopkins Student Government Association represents undergraduates in campus issues and projects. It is elected annually.

Blueprints for a new programming board called The Hopkins Organization for Programming ("The HOP") were drawn up during the summer and fall of 2006.

References 

Johns Hopkins University
Johns Hopkins University
Johns Hopikins University